Ilkka Olavi Suominen (8 April 1939 – 23 May 2022) was a Finnish politician from the National Coalition Party. He was President of the Nordic Council in 1992.

He was member of the parliament from 1970 to 1975 and from 1983 to 1994. Suominen was the chairman of the National Coalition Party 1979–1991 and twice the speaker of the parliament 1987 and 1991–1994. He held the position of minister of trade and industry in Holkeri cabinet 1987–1991. Suominen left parliament to become CEO of state monopoly Alko. He was elected as a member of the European Parliament (MEP) for one term between 1999 and 2004 (EPP).

He was also the chairman of the Parliamentary Assembly of the OSCE 1992–1994.

See also 
 Bilderberg Group

References 

1939 births
2022 deaths
People from Nakkila
National Coalition Party politicians
Ministers of Trade and Industry of Finland
Speakers of the Parliament of Finland
Members of the Parliament of Finland (1970–72)
Members of the Parliament of Finland (1972–75)
Members of the Parliament of Finland (1983–87)
Members of the Parliament of Finland (1987–91)
Members of the Parliament of Finland (1991–95)
National Coalition Party MEPs
MEPs for Finland 1999–2004
University of Helsinki alumni